Blue's 123 Time Activities is a 1999 educational game developed and published by Humongous Entertainment. The game works on Windows 95 and above, and on System 7.5.3 (with PowerPC) to Mac OS X Tiger. It was the third game in the Blue's Clues video game series, in turn based on the television series of the same name.

Gameplay 
This educational point-and-click game teaches players maths through fun activities, as they help Steve Burns and Blue and their friends accomplish goals and tasks. Kids learn skills such as measurement, estimation, weight, pattern, and counting.

Critical reception 
SuperKids said the game taught maths in a "pleasant, non-threatening way". Review Corner said the game had "excellent activities" and "good replay value". Allgame said the game captured the "flavor, feel, and tone" of the TV series. KidSource wrote the game was a "high-performance multimedia program". Discovery Education opined the game was both educational and entertaining. Sonic described the game as "wonderful" and Parent's Choice deemed it "charming". A review by education professors at the University of Texas highly recommended the title. Games First liked the difficulty system as "children can play at their own developmental level and progress as their skills improve". Playtesters thought the game was a "great learning experience". Kids Domain praised the  graphics and audio for emulating the TV series.

The game was the winner of the 1999/2000 BESSIE Award for Math.

Reviews
 Macworld - Oct 01, 1999
 All Game Guide - 1999

References 

1999 video games
Children's educational video games
Classic Mac OS games
Humongous Entertainment games
MacOS games
Mathematical education video games
Nick Jr. video games
Point-and-click adventure games
ScummVM-supported games
Single-player video games
Video games about dogs
Video games developed in the United States
Video games featuring female protagonists
Windows games